The Vanguard of the Maani Army (Movement of the Druze Jihad) – VMA (MDJ) (Arabic:  طليعة جيش المعاني (حركة الجهاد الدرزي)  | Taleat Jayish al-Maani (Harakat al-Jihad al-Duruzi)) or Avant-Garde de l'Armée Maani (mouvement du djihad druze) – AGAM (MDJ) in French, was a predominantly Druze splinter faction of the Lebanese Army that came to play a role in the 1975–77 phase of the Lebanese Civil War.

Origins
The VMA (MJD) was formed in October 1976, following the break-up early that same year of the Lebanese Army into four rival groups or factions, including a predominately Muslim faction, the Lebanese Arab Army (LAA), aligned with the left-wing Lebanese National Movement (LNM) and a mainly Christian faction, the Army of Free Lebanon (AFL) aligned in turn with the right-wing Lebanese Front.

The group's founder was the conservative Druze politician Farid Hamadeh who opposed the za'im (political boss) Kamal Jumblatt, leader of both the left-wing Progressive Socialist Party (PSP) and the LNM coalition. Closely linked to the Christian Lebanese Front coalition, the VMA (MJD)'s own manifesto claimed that their main goal was to rid Lebanon of the Palestinians and the 'communists' – meaning the Lebanese leftist parties and militias of the LNM, in addition to their allies of the Palestine Liberation Organization (PLO) guerrilla factions and the Palestinian refugees living in the country. The group's leadership also expressed its opposition to the Syrian military intervention of June 1976.

Structure and organization
Based at the Chouf District, the VMA (MJD)' strength was estimated at about 100–200 Druze regular soldiers equipped with small-arms and military vehicles drawn from Lebanese Army depots and Internal Security Forces (ISF) Police stations. It was led by Druze junior officers from the Lebanese Army, such as Raouf Abdel-Salam and Wahib Abdel-Salam.

List of VMA (MDJ) commanders
Farid Hamadeh
Raouf Abdel-Salam
Wahib Abdel-Salam

See also
 Army of Free Lebanon
 Lebanese Arab Army
 Lebanese Civil War
 Lebanese Druze
 Lebanese Front
 Lebanese Forces (Militia)
 Lebanese National Movement
 List of weapons of the Lebanese Civil War
 Progressive Socialist Party
 People's Liberation Army (Lebanon)

Notes

References

 Farid El-Kazen, The Breakdown of the State in Lebanon 1967-1976, I.B. Tauris, London 2000.  – 
 Joseph Hokayem, L'armée libanaise pendant la guerre: un instrument du pouvoir du président de la République (1975–1985), Lulu.com, Beyrouth 2012. , 1291036601 (in French) – 
 Oren Barak, The Lebanese Army – A National institution in a divided society, State University of New York Press, Albany 2009.  – 
Thomas Collelo (ed.), Lebanon: a country study, Library of Congress, Federal Research Division, Headquarters, Department of the Army (DA Pam 550-24), Washington D.C., December 1987 (Third edition 1989). –

Further reading

 Alain Menargues, Les Secrets de la guerre du Liban: Du coup d'état de Béchir Gémayel aux massacres des camps palestiniens, Albin Michel, Paris 2004.  (in French)
 Denise Ammoun, Histoire du Liban contemporain: Tome 2 1943–1990, Éditions Fayard, Paris 2005.  (in French) – 
 Fawwaz Traboulsi, A History of Modern Lebanon: Second Edition, Pluto Press, London 2012. 
 Jean Sarkis, Histoire de la guerre du Liban, Presses Universitaires de France – PUF, Paris 1993.  (in French)
 Marius Deeb, The Lebanese Civil War, Praeger Publishers Inc., New York 1980. 
Naomi Joy Weinberger, Syrian Intervention in Lebanon: The 1975-76 Civil War, Oxford University Press, Oxford 1986. , 0195040104 
 Rex Brynen, Sanctuary and Survival: the PLO in Lebanon, Boulder: Westview Press, Oxford 1990.  – 
Robert Fisk, Pity the Nation: Lebanon at War, London: Oxford University Press, (3rd ed. 2001).  – 
 Samir Kassir, La Guerre du Liban: De la dissension nationale au conflit régional, Éditions Karthala/CERMOC, Paris 1994.  (in French)
Tony Badran (Barry Rubin ed.), Lebanon: Liberation, Conflict, and Crisis, Palgrave Macmillan, London 2010. 
 William W. Harris, Faces of Lebanon: Sects, Wars, and Global Extensions, Princeton Series on the Middle East, Markus Wiener Publishers, Princeton 1997. , 1-55876-115-2

External links
Chamussy (René) – Chronique d’une guerre: Le Liban 1975-1977 – éd. Desclée – 1978 (in French)
 Histoire militaire de l'armée libanaise de 1975 à 1990 (in French)
L'armee libanaise: eclatement ou destin national? (Les Cahiers de L'Orient, 1988) (in French)

Lebanese Front
Factions in the Lebanese Civil War
Israeli–Lebanese conflict
Druze in Lebanon
History of the Druze